At the end of 2017, there were total 7,450 breweries in the United States, including 7,346 craft breweries subdivided into 2,594 brewpubs, 4,522 microbreweries, 230 regional craft breweries and 104 large/non-craft breweries. 

The following is a partial list of defunct breweries in the United States.

Defunct breweries alphabetical

A 

A. Gettelman Brewing Company
Abner-Drury Brewery
Albion Brewery
American Brewing Company (New Orleans)
American Brewing Company (Providence, Rhode Island)
Angeles Brewing and Malting Company
Arcadia Brewing Company
Ashland Brewing Company

B

Bachmann's Brewery
Bavarian Brewing Company
Beverwyck Brewery
Bosch Brewing Company
Brown's Brewery
Buckbean Brewing Company
Bunker Hill Breweries

C

Charles D. Kaier Company
Celis Brewing Company
Christian Heurich Brewing Company
City Park Brewery
Class and Nachod Brewery
Covington Brewhouse
Cream City Brewing Company

D
Dobler Brewing Company
Dubuque Star Brewery

E
Evansville Brewing Company

F

Falk Brewing Company
Falls City Brewing Company
Falstaff Brewing Corporation
Fitger's Brewing Company
Fred Koch Brewery
Fuhrmann & Schmidt Brewing Company

G
G. Heileman Brewing Company
Goebel Brewing Company
Gottfried Krueger Brewing Company
Green River Brewery
Geyer Brothers Brewery

H

Haffen Brewing Company
Haffenreffer Brewery
Hamm's Brewery
Hinchliffe Brewing
Hot Springs Hotel and Brewery

I
Independent Brewing Company of Pittsburgh
Independent Milwaukee Brewery
Iroquois Beverage Corporation

J

Jackson Brewing Company (New Orleans)
James Page Brewing Company
John F. Betz & Sons Brewery
Jordan Brewery Ruins
Joseph Schlitz Brewing Company
Philipp Jung

K
Kingsbury Breweries Company
Jackson Koehler Eagle Brewery
Krug Brewery

L

La Brasserie Brewery
The Lembeck and Betz Eagle Brewing Company
Littig Brothers/Mengel & Klindt/Eagle Brewery
Lone Star Brewing Company

M
Manhattan Brewing Company of New York
Mayfield Brewery
Metz Brewery
Michigan Brewing Company
Minneapolis Brewing Company

N
Narragansett Brewing Company (original incarnation)

National Capital Brewing Company
New Albion Brewing Company
Northwestern Brewery

O
Jacob Obermann
The Old Brewery

Oldenberg Brewery, a defunct brewery and pub, and in Fort Mitchell, Kentucky  and The American Museum of Brewing Arts part of a Greater Cincinnati tourist expansion.
Olympia Brewing Company

P

P. Ballantine and Sons Brewing Company
Pabst Brewery Complex
Paterson Consolidated Brewing Company
Pearl Brewing Company
Periolat brewery
Pete's Brewing Company

Q
Quinnipiac Brewery

R

Rainier Brewing Company
Rheingold Brewery
Reisch Beer
Reymann Brewing Company
Rio Salado Brewing Company
Rochester Brewing Company

S

San Diego Brewing Company
Schaefer Beer
Schoenhofen Brewing Company
Southwestern Brewery and Ice Company
Standard Brewing Company
Standard-Rochester Brewing Company
Stroh Brewery Company
Sugar Loaf Brewery
Sweetwater Brewery

T
Tennessee Brewing Company
E. M. Todd Company
Triaca Company
Triangle Brewing Company
Traveler Beer Company

V
Valentin Blatz Brewing Company
Virginia Brewery

W

Walter Brewing Company
Washington Brewery Company
Weinhard Brewery Complex
 White Squirrel Brewery - Bowling Green

Y
Yakima Brewing

Z
Zoller Bros-Independent Malting Co.

See also
 Beer and breweries by region
 Beer in the United States
 List of microbreweries

Notes

Defunct brewery companies of the United States
American cuisine-related lists

Lists of companies of the United States by industry